Iulică Ruican (born 29 August 1971) is a retired Romanian rower. He competed in coxed fours and eights at the 1992 and 1996 Olympics and won a gold and a silver medal in 1992. At the 1996 Olympics he served as a flag bearer for Romania at the opening ceremony. At the world championships he won seven medals between 1993 and 1998, including three gold medals.

Ruican took up rowing aged 16, and after retiring from competitions became vice president of his native club CSA Steaua București. His wife Anca Tănase is also a former Olympic rower.

References

External links

1971 births
Living people
Romanian male rowers
Rowers at the 1992 Summer Olympics
Rowers at the 1996 Summer Olympics
Olympic rowers of Romania
Olympic gold medalists for Romania
Olympic silver medalists for Romania
Olympic medalists in rowing
Medalists at the 1992 Summer Olympics
World Rowing Championships medalists for Romania